The following is a list of Michigan State Historic Sites in Jackson County, Michigan. Sites marked with a dagger (†) are also listed on the National Register of Historic Places in Jackson County, Michigan.


Current listings

See also
 National Register of Historic Places listings in Jackson County, Michigan

Sources
 Historic Sites Online – Jackson County. Michigan State Housing Developmental Authority. Accessed February 27, 2011.

References

Jackson County
State Historic Sites
Tourist attractions in Jackson County, Michigan